Wolf Mount, Wolf mountain, or variation, may refer to:

Places
 Locales
 Mount Wolf, York County, Pennsylvania, USA; a borough
 Wolf Mountains Battlefield, Montana; site of the 1877 Battle of Wolf Mountains

 Geography
 Wolf Mountain Shale, a geologic formation in Texas, USA
 Wolf Mountain (Montana), a summit in the Beartooth Mountains
 Wolf Mountains, a mountain range in Montana, USA
 Kurd Mountains (Turkish for "Wolf Mountains") highlands in Turkey

Other uses
 Battle of Wolf Mountain (8 January 1877) an Indian Wars battle with the U.S. Army
 Wolf Mountain, a ski resort in Utah, USA

See also
 Mountain wolf, the dhole of Asia
 Mountain wolf (disambiguation)
 Mad Wolf Mountain, a mountain in Montana, USA
 Lone Wolf Mountain, a mountain in B.C., Canada
 Little Wolf Mountains, a mountain range in Montana, USA
 White Wolf Mountain, a ski area in California, USA